CTV (formerly known as CTV Main Channel) is a free-to-air terrestrial television channel of the China Television company and is the second oldest free-to-air terrestrial television channel in the Republic of China (Taiwan) after TTV Main Channel.

History
It was established on September 3, 1968, test of transmission on October 10, 1969 and officially inaugurated by the 3rd Vice President of the Republic of China Yen Chia-kan on October 31, 1969.

Appearances

Test card
The testcard of CTV is Philips PM5544.

See also
 Media of Taiwan

References

Television stations in Taiwan
Television channels and stations established in 1969